Cath Kidston Limited is a British international home furnishing retail company with headquarters in London, with a focus on handicraft and vintage themed items that embody a quintessentially British lifestyle.

Designer Cath Kidston opened her first shop in London's Holland Park in 1994, selling hand-embroidered tea-towels and brightly renovated furniture. She later described it as a "glorified junk shop". In April 2011, there were 41 shops and concessions in the UK, two in the Republic of Ireland, eleven in Japan and three in Korea. Less than three years later there were 136 outlets, including a flagship store on Piccadilly next to Fortnum & Mason, and four stores in China. Appearing on BBC Radio 4's Desert Island Discs programme, she described her shops as provoking a 'Marmite reaction': "People either love it and want a little bit of it very much, or want to stab us."

The company's profits jumped more than 60 per cent from £2.9m to £4.6m in the year to March 2009. Sales rose to £31.3m during the period, compared with £19.3m the year before, partly due to new store openings.

In 2010, Cath Kidston sold a majority stake of the company to private equity investors TA Associates, retaining a minority stake and remaining the company's Creative Director.

In October 2016, TA Associates sold its stake to Baring Private Equity Asia for an undisclosed amount. The transaction saw chairman Paul Mason replaced by William Flanz, former chairman and executive of Gucci Group.

In April 2020, during the coronavirus pandemic, the company underwent a "pre-pack" administration. This resulted in the closure of all 60 UK stores on 21 April, with the loss of over 900 jobs. Under the arrangement, the company planned to continue trading online and via its wholesale and franchise businesses including overseas outlets.

References

External links
 Cath Kidston Limited

1993 establishments in England
Retail companies of England
Companies based in the Royal Borough of Kensington and Chelsea